The 1936 NCAA Wrestling Championships involved eleven teams to determine the National Collegiate Athletic Association (NCAA) college wrestling national champion, and each wrestler competed for individual championships. The 9th edition of the tournament began on March 20, 1936, and concluded on March 21. Washington and Lee University in Lexington, Virginia hosted the tournament at Doremus Gymnasium.

The Oklahoma Sooners ended the streak of eight consecutive team championships of their Bedlam rivals the Oklahoma A&M Cowboys to claim their first team title. Oklahoma A&M finished in a second place tie with the Central State Bronchos.

Team standings

References

NCAA Division I Wrestling Championship
Wrestling competitions in the United States
1936 in sport wrestling
1936 in sports in Virginia